Jilotlán de los Dolores  is a town and municipality, in Jalisco in central-western Mexico. The municipality covers an area of 1511.78 km2.

As of 2005, the municipality had a total population of 8,579.

Government

Municipal presidents

References

Municipalities of Jalisco